Spunk Creek is a stream in the U.S. state of Minnesota.

The creek's name comes from the Ojibwe Indians, for the spunk, or firewood, they collected in the area.

See also
List of rivers of Minnesota

References

Rivers of Morrison County, Minnesota
Rivers of Stearns County, Minnesota
Rivers of Minnesota